Sivan (Hebrew: סִיוָן, Standard Sīvan, Tiberian Sīwān; from Akkadian simānu, meaning "Season; time") is the ninth month of the civil year and the third month of the ecclesiastical year on the Hebrew calendar. It is a month of 30 days. Sivan usually falls in May–June on the Gregorian calendar.

Along with all other current, post-biblical Jewish month names, Sivan was adopted during the Babylonian captivity. In the Babylonian calendar it was named Araḫ Simanu.

Holidays in Sivan
 6–7 Sivan – Shavuot

Sivan in Jewish history

 1 Sivan (1096) – Worms Jews massacred as part of the Rhineland massacres by the First Crusade during morning prayers after taking refuge in a local castle. (see "Iyar in Jewish History" for Iyar 8.)
 4 Sivan ( BCE) – Birth of David.
 6 Sivan (c. ?) - Birth of the Seventh Antediluvian Patriarch/Hero Enoch.
 6 Sivan (c. 1313 BCE) – The Torah was given to Moses at Mount Sinai and thus observed as the holiday of Shavuot.
 6 Sivan (c. 940 BCE) - Death of David.
 6 Sivan (1760) – Death of Baal Shem Tov
 6 Sivan (1940) – Death of Rabbi Yaakov Yehuda Aryeh Leib Frenkel
 7 Sivan (c. 1233 BCE) – Moses was "drawn out" of the water at three months old, and thus given the name "Moshe" also observed on the holiday of Shavuot.
 7 Sivan (1834) – 1834 looting of Safed breaks out
 7 Sivan (1966) – Death of Rabbi Yisroel Moshe Olewski
 13 Sivan (1648) – Cossack riots begin with the Khmelnytsky Uprising pogrom
 20 Sivan (1171) – The first blood libel in France – tens of Jewish men and women were burned alive in the French town of Blois on the accusation that Jews used the blood of Christian children in the preparation of matzah for Passover.
 23 Sivan (474 BCE) – Mordecai and Esther sent letters so that the Jews shall prepare themselves for the annihilation plan orchestrated by Haman to be committed against them on the 13th of the following Adar.
 27 Sivan (1790) – "Purim of Florence" – a celebration set to celebrate this day when Florentine Jews were saved from a mob.

See also
 Jewish astrology

References

External links
 About the Month of Sivan
 Resources on the Month of Sivan

 
Months of the Hebrew calendar